Pendulum Press was a publishing company based in West Haven, Connecticut, that operated from 1970 to 1994, producing the bulk of their material in the 1970s. The company is most well known for their comic book adaptations of literary classics. The Pendulum Now Age Classics series published black-and-white paperback adaptations of more than 70 literary classics,  such as Twenty Thousand Leagues Under the Sea, The War of the Worlds, and Moby-Dick. These stories were later widely reprinted by other publishers (including by Marvel Comics) well into the 2000s. Pendulum also published a line of historical comics, a line of comic book biographies, and a line of comic book adaptations of inspiring stories and morality tales. 

Founded by David Oliphant as a division of Academic Industries, Inc., Pendulum's comics division was overseen by veteran creator/editor Vincent Fago. The company received Title One funds from the U.S. government to produce comics with an educational focus.

History

Pendulum Illustrated Classics 

In 1970, Vincent Fago, the former editor-in-chief of Timely Comics, was hired by Pendulum to produce the Pendulum Now Age Classics series, which were black-and-white paperback adaptations of literary classics. Specifically designed for classroom use, the series used set type instead of hand lettering, vocabulary appropriate for grade levels, and included word lists and questions at the back.

Acting as a publisher from his studio in Bethel, Vermont, Fago edited and handled production on the nearly one hundred titles in the series. Adaptations were handled by writers like Otto Binder, Naunerle Farr, Kin Platt, Irwin Shapiro, and Fago's son John Norwood Fago.

After having difficulty finding American artists to illustrate the comics, Fago turned to Filipino artist Nestor Redondo, who offered to help recruit some of his fellow Filipino comics artists — these artists ended up illustrating almost every comic Pendulum produced. In addition to the work of Redondo, who illustrated more than 20 books in the series, the Pendulum Illustrated Classics featured the artwork of Alex Niño, Gerry Talaoc, Vicatan, Rudy Nebres, Jun Lofamia, Nestor Leonidez, and E. R. Cruz. (Redondo's brothers Virgilio and Frank also illustrated books in the series.)

Comics in the series were published from 1973 to 1980; the series ended with a selection of Shakespeare plays adapted into comics form.

Ancillaries and reprints 
From 1976–1981, Fago produced a multimedia read-along program for the series, called New Matter Sounds. Each packet contained a reading booklet, a student activity booklet, a sound cassette, and an answer key sheet. Some of the packets contained a narrated film strip along with the other materials.

Many of the early issues in the Pendulum Illustrated Classics series were reprinted, in color with new covers, in 1976 by Marvel Comics as Marvel Classics Comics.

In 1984, Pendulum's parent company Academic Industries reprinted a number of the Illustrated Classics (as well as other Pendulum comics) in a smaller format.

In 1984–1988, Pendulum and the Indian publisher Pai and Company (Paico) co-published series as Paico Classics in various Indian languages (as well as the original English). Paico republished the series in 1998–2000.

In 1990–1991, Pendulum itself reprinted a selection of Pendulum Illustrated Classics, retitled Pendulum's Illustrated Stories, in colorized versions with new painted covers. Originally planned to run 72 issues, the company only produced six issues before abandoning the project.

In 1994, Pendulum reprinted its 1974 adaptation of The Hunchback of Notre-Dame, colorized in a prestige format comic under the banner of the Phonics Classic Achievement Series. It announced more titles but these were also abandoned when the company closed down.

Also in 1994, Lake Illustrated Classics (a division of AGS Secondary) reprinted many of the  Pendulum Illustrated Classics under their own banner.

Since 2006, Saddleback Educational Publishing has reprinted many of the  Pendulum Illustrated Classics under their own banner, using the 1990-91 cover format.

Other publications 
In 1976, to tie in with America's bicentennial, Pendulum published a line of historical comics called the Basic Illustrated History of America. This line was edited by Vince Fago's wife, D'ann Calhoun, and written by Naunerle Farr. 

In 1978 Pendulum also published a primer on the value of comics as an education tool.

In 1978–79, Pendulum published a line of comic book biographies under the series title Pendulum Illustrated Biography Series. The books were flip books — half the book would feature one notable person, and then the reader would flip the book over to read the biography of the other featured notable.

In 1978–79, Pendulum published the series Contemporary Motivators, a line of comic book adaptations of inspiring stories and morality tales like Banner in the Sky, God Is My Co-Pilot, Guadalcanal Diary, The Diary of Anne Frank, and Lost Horizon; as well as a rough adaptation of Star Wars. Like the Illustrated Classics series, these comics were specifically designed for classroom use, with typeset instead of hand lettering, vocabulary appropriate for grade levels, and word lists and questions at the back.

In 1979, the company introduced the Pendulum Illustrated Original series, mostly featuring the new superhero Solarman, created by Pendulum founder and president David Oliphant. Solarman was later revived by Marvel Comics in a 1989 series.

Pendulum also published a small line of prose books, by authors such as David M. Kennedy, Bertram Wyatt-Brown, and Joseph Payne Brennan, including biographical, sociology, and poetry titles.

Titles

Comics

Pendulum Illustrated Classics

Pendulum's Illustrated Stories 
 Colorized reprints of the  Pendulum Illustrated Classics
 Moby-Dick (1990)
 Treasure Island (1990)
 Dr. Jekyll and Mr. Hyde (1990)
 20,000 Leagues Under the Sea (Mar. 1991)
 A Christmas Carol (1991)
 A Midsummer Night's Dream (1991)

Basic Illustrated History of America
 edited by D'Ann Calhoun with Lawrence Bloch
 The New World, 1500-1750 (1976) — written by Naunerle Farr and illustrated by E. R. Cruz; part of New Matter Sounds multimedia packet
 The Fight for Freedom, 1750–1783 (1976) — written by Naunerle Farr and illustrated by Virgilio Redondo
 The United States Emerges, 1783–1800 (1976)  — written by Naunerle Farr and illustrated by Fred Carrillo
 Problems of the New Nation, 1800-1830 (1976) — written by Naunerle Farr & Dennis Dostert, and illustrated by Jun Lofamia
 Americans Move Westward, 1800-1850 (1977) — written by Naunerle Farr and illustrated by Frank Redondo; 16 pp.
 Before the Civil War, 1830-1860 (1976) — written by Naunerle Farr & Dennis Dostert] and illustrated by E. R. Cruz
 The Civil War, 1850-1876 (1976) — written by Naunerle Farr and illustrated by Nestor Redondo; part of New Matter Sounds multimedia packet
 The Industrial Era, 1865-1915 (1976) — written by Naunerle Farr & Dennis Dostert, and illustrated by Fred Carrillo
 America Becomes a World Power, 1890-1920 (1977) — written by Naunerle Farr and illustrated by Resty Ronguillo
 The Roaring Twenties and the Great Depression, 1920–1940 (1976) — written by Naunerle Farr and illustrated by Tony Caravana
 World War II, 1940-1945 (1976) — written by Naunerle Farr and illustrated by N. E. Phillips
 America Today, 1945-1976 (1976) — written by Naunerle Farr and illustrated by Nardo Cruz

Pendulum Illustrated Biography series 
 Houdini/Walt Disney (1978) — written by John Norwood Fago and illustrated by Eufronio Reyes
 Abraham Lincoln/Franklin D. Roosevelt (1979) — written by Naunerle Farr and illustrated by Nestor Redondo (Lincoln) and Jun Lofamia (Roosevelt)
 Babe Ruth/Jackie Robinson (1979) — written by Naunerle Farr and illustrated by Tony Caravana (Ruth) and Nardo Cruz (Robinson)
 Charles Lindbergh/Amelia Earhart (1979) — written by John Norwood Fago and Naunerle Farr, and illustrated by Vicatan
  Elvis Presley/The Beatles (1979) — adapted by Stella Alico and illustrated by E. R. Cruz (Elvis) and Ernie Guanlao (Beatles); the Beatles portion was included as part of Pendulum's High Motivation Reading Series sponsored by Radio Shack
 Jim Thorpe/Althea Gibson (1979) — written by John Norwood Fago and illustrated by Frank Redondo
 Madame Curie/Albert Einstein (1979) — written by Naunerle Farr and illustrated by Nestor Redondo
 Thomas Edison/Alexander Graham Bell (1979) — written by Naunerle Farr and illustrated by Gerry Talaoc (Edison) and Angel Trinidad (Bell)
  Vince Lombardi/Pelé (1979) — written by John Norwood Fago and illustrated by Tony Caravana (Lombardi) and Nardo Cruz (Pelé)

Contemporary Motivators series 
 Star Wars adapted by Linda A. Cadrain and Charles Nicholas (1978)
 The Caine Mutiny
 Banner in the Sky
 God Is My Co-Pilot adapted by Linda A. Cadrain and Charles Nicholas
 Guadalcanal Diary (June 1978)
 Hiroshima
 Hot Rod (1978)
 Just Dial a Number by Edith Maxwell, adapted by Charles Nicholas
 The Diary of Anne Frank (1979)
 Lost Horizon adapted by Catherine Wichterman and Charles Nicholas (1978)

Solarman (1979–1980) 
 Solarman #1: The Beginning (1979) — written by David Oliphant and M. Barbara O'Brien; adapted by Linda A. Cadrain and uncredited artist
 Solarman #2: Day or Nite (1980) — written by David Oliphant and illustrated by Dick Giordano
 Solarman: At the Earth's Core (1980)

Books 
 The American People in the Age of Kennedy, by David M. Kennedy (1973)
 The American People in the Antebellum South, edited by Bertram Wyatt-Brown (1973)
 A Sheaf of Snow Poems, by Joseph Payne Brennan (1973)
 The Illustrated Format: an Effective Teaching Tool (1978)

See also 

Other companies/imprints known for comics adaptations of literature:
Classical Comics
Gilberton
Marvel Illustrated
 Paico Classics
Self Made Hero

References

External links 
 
 

Defunct publishing companies of the United States
Defunct comics and manga publishing companies
Comic book publishing companies of the United States
1970 establishments in the United States
Companies based in New Haven County, Connecticut
Comics based on fiction